"Hi" was the second British single and the first US single taken from Psapp's The Only Thing I Ever Wanted.  The EP features the album version of "Hi," as well as one previously available and three new tracks.  "Side Dish" was originally found on Northdown and Early Cats and Tracks.

Track listing

Personnel

Psapp

Carim Clasmann
Galia Durant

Additional personnel

Markus Liebetanz - drums, "Hi"

External links
Psapp jumble shop (official)
Psapp official website
Hi EP at Domino Records
Psapp at Domino Records

2005 EPs
Psapp albums
Domino Recording Company EPs